The FIL Literary Award in Romance Languages (previously Juan Rulfo Prize for Latin American and Caribbean Literature),
is awarded to writers of any genre of literature (poetry, novels, plays, short stories and literary essays), having as a means of artistic expression one of the Romance languages: Spanish, Catalan, Galician, French, Occitan, Italian, Romanian or Portuguese. Endowed with $150,000, it is given to a writer in recognition to all their work, making it one of the richest literary prizes in the world.

It was created in 1991 to acknowledge, in the beginning, writers of literature from Latin America or the Caribbean.
It is organized by Mexico's National Council for Culture and Arts, the University of Guadalajara, the government of the state of Jalisco, and the Fondo de Cultura Económica and is named in honor of writer Juan Rulfo, a native of Sayula, Jalisco. It is awarded during the Guadalajara International Book Fair (FIL).

The name "Juan Rulfo" is a registered trademark and the Rulfo family asked that it be removed from association with the prize. As a result, beginning in 2006, the award was renamed FIL Literary Award in Romance Languages.

Prize winners

References

External links 
FIL Literary Award in Romance Languages

Latin American literary awards 
Mexican literary awards
Awards established in 1991
1991 establishments in Mexico
Literary awards honoring lifetime achievement